The following is a list of the 17 cantons of the Meuse department, in France, following the French canton reorganisation which came into effect in March 2015:

 Ancerville
 Bar-le-Duc-1
 Bar-le-Duc-2
 Belleville-sur-Meuse
 Bouligny
 Clermont-en-Argonne
 Commercy
 Dieue-sur-Meuse
 Étain
 Ligny-en-Barrois
 Montmédy
 Revigny-sur-Ornain
 Saint-Mihiel
 Stenay
 Vaucouleurs
 Verdun-1
 Verdun-2

References